Provisioning refers to the supplying of food and drink for the passengers of a cruise ship. As cruise ships consume large amounts of food every day, this operation can be complex. Not all the food will be consumed during the voyage, and the ship must keep a percentage in reserve to allow for delays.

References 

Foodservice